The Team large hill competition at the FIS Nordic World Ski Championships 2019 was held on 24 February 2019.

Results
The first round was started at 14:45 and the final round at 15:55.

References

Team large hill